Kærlighed ved første hik (Love at First Hiccough) is a 1999 Danish drama film based on the novel by Dennis Jürgensen.

Cast 
 Robert Hansen - Viktor
 Sofie Lassen-Kahlke - Anja
 Sebastian Jessen - Brian 
 Rasmus Albeck - Esben 
 Karl Bille - Thorkild
 Jonas Gülstorff - Nikolaj
 Joachim Knop - Peter

External links 

Entry in danskefilm

1999 drama films
1999 films
Films based on Danish novels
Danish drama films
1990s Danish-language films